Lead Hill is a town in Boone County, Arkansas, United States. The population was 271 at the 2010 census. It is part of the Harrison Micropolitan Statistical Area.

History
Lead Hill was named from valuable deposits of lead in the vicinity.

Geography
Lead Hill is located at  (36.414815, -92.906907).

Major highways

 Arkansas Highway 7
 Arkansas Highway 14

Demographics

As of the census of 2000, there were 287 people, 126 households, and 86 families residing in the town. The racial makeup of the town was 96.86% White, 0.35% Asian, and 2.79% from two or more races.  0.35% of the population were Hispanic or Latino of any race.

There were 126 households, out of which 28.6% had children under the age of 18 living with them, 57.1% were married couples living together, 10.3% had a female householder with no husband present, and 31.7% were non-families. 27.8% of all households were made up of individuals, and 18.3% had someone living alone who was 65 years of age or older.  The average household size was 2.28 and the average family size was 2.78.

In the town, the population was spread out, with 23.7% under the age of 18, 3.8% from 18 to 24, 24.7% from 25 to 44, 22.0% from 45 to 64, and 25.8% who were 65 years of age or older.  The median age was 43 years. For every 100 females, there were 90.1 males.  For every 100 females age 18 and over, there were 79.5 males.

The median income for a household in the town was $30,625, and the median income for a family was $32,500. Males had a median income of $24,375 versus $18,864 for females. The per capita income for the town was $13,051.  About 9.3% of families and 15.7% of the population were below the poverty line, including 23.4% of those under the age of eighteen and 12.8% of those 65 or over.

Education 
Lead Hill, along with South Lead Hill and Diamond City, is within the Lead Hill School District, which leads to graduation from Lead Hill High School.

Climate
Due to its elevation, northerly latitude, and surrounding topography, Lead Hill often experiences the lowest minimum temperatures during Arkansas's cooler months. This distinction, though, is often shared with the small Buffalo River hamlet of Gilbert.

Points of interest
Ozark Medieval Fortress 

Bull Shoals Lake

Lead Hill is located near Branson, Missouri and Diamond City.

References

External links
 Map of Lead Hill (US Census Bureau)
 Boone County Historical and Railroad Society, Inc.
 Lead Hill School District
 Town government information
 Detailed 2000 US Census statistics
 Boone County School District Reference Map (US Census Bureau, 2010)

Towns in Boone County, Arkansas
Towns in Arkansas
Harrison, Arkansas micropolitan area